Arthur Bliss Copp  (July 10, 1870 – December 5, 1949) was a Canadian politician.

Born in Jolicure, New Brunswick, to Joseph Harvey Copp and Frances Lydia Brennan.  He was a lawyer before being elected to the Legislative Assembly of New Brunswick in a 1901 by-election; he represented Westmorland County until 1912. He was first elected to the House of Commons of Canada for the New Brunswick riding of Westmorland in a 1915 by-election. A Liberal, he was re-elected in 1917 and 1921. From 1921 to 1925, he was the Secretary of State of Canada. In 1925, he was called to the Senate of Canada representing the senatorial division of Westmorland, New Brunswick. He died in office in 1949. He is buried in the Sackville Rural Cemetery in Sackville, New Brunswick.

Electoral record 

|- 
  
|Liberal
|Arthur Bliss Copp 
|align="right"|acclaimed

References
 

1870 births
1949 deaths
Canadian senators from New Brunswick
Laurier Liberals
Liberal Party of Canada MPs
Liberal Party of Canada senators
Members of the House of Commons of Canada from New Brunswick
Members of the King's Privy Council for Canada
New Brunswick Liberal Association MLAs
People from Westmorland County, New Brunswick